Choralerna, was a gospel-choir from Göteborg, Sweden active from 1968-1981. They were conducted by Jan-Olof "Jum-Jum" Johansson 1968-1969 and then by Lars Brandströmsv 1969-1981. Choralerna was one of Sweden's first and most well known gospel-choirs.

They increased their international following by playing at Spree '73 and performing Living Water at Eurofest '75 as one of the main attractions.

Discography
 1969 Gospel Soul (EP) (Signatursv)
 1969 Over My head (Signatur)
 1970 Get back, Satan (single) (Signatur)
 1971 Step Out (Signatur)
 1972 Choralerna Live (Signatur)
 1973 Power (Signatur)
 1974 Let's Celebrate (Key Records)
 1975 Living Water (Choralerna production)
 1976  Let There Be Light (Myrrh UK) 
 1976 Varde ljus (Signatur)
 1978 Danniebelle Live in Sweden (Sparrow) (with Danniebelle Hall)
 1979 Vingar som bär (Signatur)

References

External links
  Choralerna's History

Culture in Gothenburg
Gospel music groups
Swedish choirs
Musical groups established in 1968